Gerd-e Siah (also Romanized as Gerd-e Sīāh) is a village in Fin Rural District, Fin District, Bandar Abbas County, Hormozgan Province, Iran. At the 2006 census, its population was 122, in 25 families.

References 

Populated places in Bandar Abbas County